Lore Bruggeman (born 30 April 2002) is a Belgian skateboarder. She made her debut appearance at the Olympics representing Belgium at the 2020 Summer Olympics where skateboarding was also added in Olympics for the very first time. During the 2020 Summer Olympics, she competed in women's street event.

References

External links 
 
 
 

2002 births
Living people
Belgian skateboarders
Belgian sportswomen
Female skateboarders
Olympic skateboarders of Belgium
Skateboarders at the 2020 Summer Olympics
People from Deerlijk
Sportspeople from West Flanders